Madan Kaur is a former Minister of Forest in Govt. of Rajasthan. She is a former Zila Pramukh from Barmer Zila Prishad and Ex-MLA from constituency Pachpadra. She is a leader of Indian National Congress.

References

1935 births
Indian National Congress politicians from Rajasthan
Living people
People from Barmer district
Rajasthan MLAs 1967–1972
Rajasthan MLAs 1972–1977
Rajasthan MLAs 1977–1980
State cabinet ministers of Rajasthan
Women in Rajasthan politics
20th-century Indian women politicians
20th-century Indian politicians
Women state cabinet ministers of India